Cesiomaggiore is a comune (municipality) in the Italian region of Veneto, located about  northwest of Venice and about  southwest of Belluno.

International relations

Twin towns - Sister cities 
  Aratiba, Brazil

References 

Cities and towns in Veneto